Fencing at the 2014 Summer Youth Olympics was held from 17 to 20 August at the Nanjing International Expo Center in Nanjing, China.

Qualification
Each National Olympic Committee (NOC) can enter a maximum of 6 competitors, 3 per each gender and 1 per each weapon. 60 places will be decided at the 2014 Cadet World Championships held in Plovdiv, Bulgaria from 3–12 April 2014. The top 4 European, top 2 American, top 2 Asian/Oceania and top African fencers from each event will qualify. Furthermore, the top 2 Oceania fencers and the top fencer from Africa, Americas, Asia and Europe across all events not yet qualified will also qualify. As hosts, China was given the maximum quota should they not qualify, but declined to use those extra spots and a further 12, 6 in each gender was initially given by the Tripartite Commission, but only nine spots were used.

To be eligible to participate at the Youth Olympics athletes must have been born between 1 January 1997 and 31 December 1999.

Schedule

The schedule was released by the Nanjing Youth Olympic Games Organizing Committee.

All times are CST (UTC+8)

Medal summary

Medal table

Events

References

External links
Official Results Book – Fencing

 
2014 Summer Youth Olympics events
Youth Summer Olympics
International fencing competitions hosted by China
2014